The 2018 BBVA Open Ciudad de Valencia was a professional tennis tournament played on outdoor clay courts. It was the third edition of the tournament and was part of the 2018 ITF Women's Circuit. It took place in Valencia, Spain, on 24–30 September 2018.

Singles main draw entrants

Seeds 

 1 Rankings as of 17 September 2018.

Other entrants 
The following players received a wildcard into the singles main draw:
  Marina Bassols Ribera
  Guiomar Maristany
  Olga Sáez Larra
  Isabelle Wallace

The following players received entry into the singles main draw using a protected ranking:
  Anne Schäfer
  Rebecca Šramková

The following players received entry from the qualifying draw:
  Marie Benoît
  Andrea Gámiz
  Eva Guerrero Álvarez
  Paula Ormaechea

The following player received entry as a lucky loser:
  Gabriela Cé

Champions

Singles

 Paula Badosa Gibert def.  Aliona Bolsova Zadoinov, 6–1, 4–6, 6–2

Doubles

 Irina Khromacheva /  Nina Stojanović def.  Valentini Grammatikopoulou /  Renata Zarazúa, 6–1, 6–4

External links 
 2018 BBVA Open Ciudad de Valencia at ITFtennis.com
 Official website

2018 ITF Women's Circuit
2018 in Spanish tennis
Tennis tournaments in Spain